Shirin Ab (also Romanized as Shīrīn Āb; also known as Shīrīn Āb-e Ghazāl Khānom) is a village in Fathabad Rural District, in the Central District of Qasr-e Shirin County, Kermanshah Province, Iran. At the 2006 census, its population was 238, in 58 families.

References 

Populated places in Qasr-e Shirin County